Novica Maksimović (born 4 April 1988) is a Serbian professional footballer who plays as a defensive midfielder for Serbian club Vojvodina.

References

External links
 
 Stats at Utakmica.rs

1988 births
Living people
People from Kula, Serbia
Serbian footballers
Association football midfielders
FK Crvena Stijena players
FK Hajduk Kula players
RFK Novi Sad 1921 players
FK Sloboda Užice players
FK Spartak Subotica players
FK Vojvodina players
Lombard-Pápa TFC footballers
Panionios F.C. players
Serbian SuperLiga players
Nemzeti Bajnokság I players
Super League Greece players
Serbian expatriate footballers
Expatriate footballers in Montenegro
Expatriate footballers in Hungary
Expatriate footballers in Greece
Serbian expatriate sportspeople in Montenegro
Serbian expatriate sportspeople in Hungary